Hular may refer to:
 Hular-e Olya
 Pain Hular